Whispers in the Night: Stories of the Mysterious & Macabre is a collection of horror, suspense and science fiction short stories by author Basil Copper. It was released in 1999 by Fedogan & Bremer in an edition of 1,100 copies of which 100 were numbered and signed by the author and artist. All but three of the stories are original to this collection. The others first appeared in the anthologies The Mammoth Book of Frankenstein, The Vampire Omnibus and Horror for Christmas.

Contents
 "Out of the Fog: Recollection", by Stephen Jones
 "Better Dead"
 "Reader, I Buried Him!"
 "One for the Pot"
 "Wish You Were Here"
 "In a Darkling Wood"
 "The Grass"
 "Riding the Chariot"
 "Final Destination"
 "The Obelisk"
 "Out There"
 "The Summerhouse"

References

1999 short story collections
Science fiction short story collections
Horror short story collections
Fedogan & Bremer books